The Gulf of Aqaba or Gulf of Eilat is a large gulf at the northern tip of the Red Sea, east of the Sinai Peninsula and west of the Arabian Peninsula. Its coastline is divided among four countries: Egypt, Israel, Jordan, and Saudi Arabia.

Geography
The gulf is east of the Sinai Peninsula and west of the Arabian Peninsula. With the Gulf of Suez to the west, it extends from the northern portion of the Red Sea.

Like the coastal waters of the Red Sea, the gulf is one of the world's premier sites for diving. The area is especially rich in coral and other marine biodiversity and has accidental shipwrecks and vessels deliberately sunk in an effort to provide a habitat for marine organisms and bolster the local dive tourism industry.

Cities

At this northern end of the gulf are three important cities: Taba in Egypt, Eilat in Israel, and Aqaba in Jordan. They are strategically important commercial ports and popular resorts for tourists seeking to enjoy the warm climate.  Further south, Haql is the largest Saudi Arabian city on the gulf.  On Sinai, Sharm el-Sheikh and Dahab are the major centres. 

The largest population center is Aqaba, with a population of 148,398 (2015), followed by Eilat with a population of 50,724 (2020).

Extent
The International Hydrographic Organization defines the southern limit of the gulf as "A line running from Ràs al Fasma Southwesterly to Requin Island through Tiran Island to the Southwest point thereof and thence Westward on a parallel (27°54'N) to the coast of the Sinaï Peninsula".

Geology
The gulf is one of two gulfs created by the Sinai Peninsula's bifurcation of the northern Red Sea, the Gulf of Suez lying to the west of the peninsula and the Gulf of Aqaba to its east. Geologically, the gulf forms the southern end of the Dead Sea Transform. It contains three small pull-apart basins, the Elat Deep, Aragonese Deep and Dakar Deep, formed between four left lateral strike-slip fault segments. Movement on one of these faults caused the 1995 Gulf of Aqaba earthquake.

Ecology

History

Trade across the Red Sea between Thebes port of Elim and Elat at the head of the gulf is documented as early as the Fourth Dynasty of Egypt. Expeditions crossing the Red Sea and heading south to Punt are mentioned in the fifth, the sixth, the eleventh, the twelfth and the eighteenth dynasties of Egypt, when Hatshepsut built a fleet to support the trade and journeyed south to Punt in a six-month voyage.
Thebes used Nubian gold or Nub from her conquests south into Kush to facilitate the purchase of frankincense, myrrh, bitumen, natron, juniper oil, linen, and copper amulets for the mummification industry at Karnak. Egyptian settlements near Timna at the head of the gulf date to the Eighteenth dynasty of Egypt.

At the northern edge, the ancient city of Ayla (in present-day Aqaba) was a commercial hub for the Nabateans. The Romans built the Via Traiana Nova, which joined the King's Highway at Aqaba and connected Africa to Asia and the Levant and Red Sea shipping.

Aqaba was a major Ottoman port, connected to Damascus and Medina by the Hejaz railway.  During World War I, the Battle of Aqaba was the key battle that ended a 500-year Ottoman rule over Greater Syria.

Tourism

The gulf is one of the most popular diving destinations in the world. About 250,000 dives are performed annually in Eilat's 11 km coastline, and diving represents 10% of the tourism income of this area.

The Landscape of Wadi Rum to the east of the northern edge of the gulf is a popular destination. Other destinations are the ruins of the iron-age civilization of Ayla in the city of Aqaba, the site of the World War I Battle of Aqaba, led by Lawrence of Arabia.

Whales, orcas, dolphins, dugongs, and whale sharks live in the gulf as well.

See also

Al Jawf Region/Tabuk Region
Aqaba Governorate
Israeli Diving Federation
South Sinai Governorate
Tourism in Egypt
Tourism in Israel
Tourism in Jordan
Wadi Sayq/Khor Kharfot

References

External links

 The Red Sea Marine Peace Park page on Israel's Ministry of Foreign Affairs - a joint Israel-Jordan initiative

Bodies of water of the Red Sea
Aqaba
Bodies of water of Egypt
Bodies of water of Israel
Bodies of water of Jordan
Gulfs of Saudi Arabia
Aqaba
Great Rift Valley
South Sinai Governorate
Jordan–Saudi Arabia border
Israel–Jordan border
Egypt–Israel border
Aqaba